"Tell Me Something Good" is a song by Rufus and Chaka Khan, written by Stevie Wonder and released in 1974. The single was a hit in the United States, peaking at number three on the Billboard Hot 100 and spent one week at number one on the Cash Box Top 100. It was among the earliest hits to use the guitar talk box, by Tony Maiden.

Production
The record was produced by the band with Bob Monaco.

The song has been described as having ".. rude metallic guitar" (by Al Ciner) and ".. a beautiful bass, clav and heavy breathing groove." The song can be difficult to count as there is an off-count into the verse. The first note is on the "and of four."

Critical reception
Jason Elias of AllMusic described the song as "a rare instance of an artist like Stevie Wonder giving away a tune that he could have had a big hit with himself."

The band played the song on the television show Soul Train, when producer and host Don Cornelius, who knew the band from Chicago and who was a good friend of their drummer Andre Fischer, allowed them to perform three songs, rather than the customary two. The band brought the Tower of Power horn section with them.

Awards
Rufus won the Grammy Award for Best R&B Vocal Performance by a Duo, Group or Chorus for the song at the 17th Annual Grammy Awards in 1975.

Charts

Weekly charts

Year-end charts

Personnel
 Chaka Khan – lead vocals, background vocals
 Ron Stockert – vocals, keyboards
 Kevin Murphy – organ, Hohner clavinet
 Nate Morgan (uncredited) – keyboards
 Al Ciner – guitar
 Tony Maiden (uncredited) – guitar, talk box
 Dennis Belfield – bass, background vocals
 André Fischer – drums, percussion

Popular culture references

 BET cable network aired and produced a phone-in game show named after the song (which was also the theme song). Julie Rogers hosted this show which was a short-lived, live call-in game show where home viewers have to answer one question of the day that was followed by panel of three celebrity judges ranking the best responses for a prize. It aired from 1988 to 1989.
 On Will & Grace, Karen tells Jack that this is the song to which she and Stan make love. She then walks in on her husband cheating on her with the same song playing. Closed captioning for that episode incorrectly credits the song to Sly and the Family Stone.
 In That '70s Show, in the episode "Water Tower" (June 14, 1999), Eric walks in on his parents having sex to the song and it plays every time he has recurring nightmares and thoughts of his parents. It also plays on his radio.
 Ray Romano's character sings in a variation of the song while eating his wife's braciole in the Everybody Loves Raymond season 4 episode 18, "Debra Makes Something Good" (February 28, 2000).
 New York radio station WCBS-FM had a show in the morning named after the song (which was also the theme song). The host told the listeners about a positive true event that happened that day. The Bobby Bones Show also has a segment named after the song.
The song is featured in the season 3 finale of Titans. After Dick Grayson, Connor, and Gar Logan defeat Jonathan Crane, Dick calls Barbara Gordon and asks her to “tell him something good.” Bruce Wayne's computer mistakes this request for Dick telling it to play the song, which leads into a montage of the aftermath of the Titans’ heroism.

Ewan McVicar version
In 2021, Scottish DJ and producer Ewan McVicar released a dance version of the song on Trick Records which was licensed to Ministry of Sound. It reached the UK Singles Chart in September 2021, entering the top 40 of the chart dated October 15–21, 2021. On 5 November 2021, the song had reached number 15. It was certified gold by the BPI in 2022. It also reached No. 12 in Ireland, No. 34 on the Dutch Top 40 and No. 49 on the US Billboard Hot Dance/Electronic Songs chart.

Charts

Other versions and sampling
 The Ronnie Laws version was sampled by the Beastie Boys on their 1989 album Paul's Boutique.
 The UGK song "Something Good", from their 1992 debut album Too Hard to Swallow, samples the song - later chopped and screwed by DJ Screw on his 1995 release Volume II: All Screwed Up.
 Bay Area rapper Mac Dre sampled a sped-up version of the chorus in "2 Hard 4 The Fuckin' Radio" off his 1993 debut album Young Black Brotha.
 The Case song "Tell Me", on his 1999 album Personal Conversation, was based on this song.
 Pink covered the song on the soundtrack of the 2006 animated film Happy Feet.

References

External links
 List of cover versions of "Tell Me Something Good" at SecondHandSongs.com

1974 songs
1974 singles
2021 singles
Chaka Khan songs
Cashbox number-one singles
Funk songs
Songs written by Stevie Wonder
ABC Records singles
Male–female vocal duets